Classics Live and Classics Live II are a set of albums by American rock band Aerosmith, released in 1986 and 1987, respectively. Together, they constitute the band's second live offering, after Live! Bootleg. Classics Live I has gone platinum while Classics Live II has gone gold.

Classics Live

Classics Live! is made up of concert recordings from 1978 and 1984. Some of the recordings include guitarists Jimmy Crespo and Rick Dufay, who had temporarily replaced Joe Perry and Brad Whitford respectively. Different live versions of most of these songs had already been released on Live! Bootleg in 1978. Venues and dates are not listed on the sleeve, and there is only the all-encompassing and vague statement "These songs were recorded at various concerts between 1977 and 1983." It is not listed which of the four guitarists played on which tracks.

The studio track "Major Barbra" was originally recorded for the album Get Your Wings but remained unreleased. An alternate version is available on the compilation, Pandora's Box.

Track listing
All songs recorded at the Orpheum Theatre, Boston, Massachusetts, February 14, 1984, except where noted.

Charts

Certification

Classics Live II
Classics Live! II mainly features tracks recorded at a New Year's Eve show in 1984, with all five original members once again reunited. The other two tracks were the first track of 1985s Done with Mirrors, "Let the Music Do the Talking", and a rendition of 1977s "Draw the Line" from California Jam II. Aerosmith photography by Paul McAlpine

Track listing
All Songs recorded at the Orpheum Theatre, Boston, Massachusetts, December 31, 1984, except where noted.

Certification

Classics Live Complete
In 1998, Classics Live! Complete was released outside the U.S, compiling the two albums on one CD.

References

Bibliography 

1986 live albums
1987 live albums
1998 live albums
Aerosmith live albums
Albums produced by Paul O'Neill (rock producer)
Albums produced by Tony Bongiovi
Columbia Records live albums
Live album series